Silver Oak University  is located in Ahmedabad, Gujarat, India.It was founded in 2019 and is recognized by the University Grants Commission.

Controversy
In January 2022, Silver Oak University was the subject of protests against charging its students unlisted fees for ID cards.

On September 7, 2022, Silver Oak University was raided by the Income Tax Department on suspicion of tax evasion and undocumented contributions to political parties. These investigations were conducted shortly before the school's graduation ceremony, expected to be held on the 24th of September. Students have been placed on leave and the campus evacuated as investigations continue on the university's campus.

References

Universities in Gujarat
Ahmedabad district
Private universities in India
2019 establishments in Gujarat